Amaxia beata is a moth of the subfamily Arctiinae. It was described by Paul Dognin in 1909. It is found in French Guiana.

References

Moths described in 1909
Amaxia
Moths of South America